Nate Binder (born September 28, 1985) is a former professional Canadian football wide receiver. He was drafted 24th overall by the Lions in the 2010 CFL Draft and signed a contract with the team on May 25, 2010. He played college football for the Tusculum Pioneers. Binder also played for the Edmonton Eskimos.

References

External links
Just Sports Stats

1985 births
Living people
BC Lions players
Canadian football wide receivers
Edmonton Elks players
Sportspeople from Windsor, Ontario
Players of Canadian football from Ontario
Tusculum Pioneers football players